The International Council of Museums (ICOM) is a non-governmental organisation dedicated to museums, maintaining formal relations with UNESCO and having a consultative status with the United Nations Economic and Social Council. Founded in 1946, ICOM also partners with entities such as the World Intellectual Property Organization, Interpol, and the World Customs Organization in order to carry out its international public service missions, which include fighting illicit traffic in cultural goods and promoting risk management and emergency preparedness to protect world cultural heritage in the event of natural or man-made disasters. Members of the ICOM get the ICOM membership card, which provides free entry, or entry at a reduced rate, to many museums all over the world.

History
ICOM traces it roots back to the defunct International Museums Office (OIM (Office internalional des musées)), created in 1926 by the League of Nations. An agency of the League's International Commission on Intellectual Cooperation, like many of the League's initiatives the OIM was dissolved following WWII, and its activities later assumed by ICOM.

ICOM Code of Ethics for Museums
ICOM adopted its ICOM Code of Ethics for Museums in 1986, a reference tool that sets standards of excellence to which all members of the organisation must adhere. The ICOM Code of Ethics for Museums, translated into 39 languages and revised in 2004, establishes values and principles shared by ICOM and the international museum community. These standards of self-regulation by museums include basic principles for museum governance, the acquisition and disposal of collections, and rules for professional conduct.

A decision was reached in 2019 following the 25th General Conference of ICOM that the Code should be reviewed and revised if necessary. The review process is ongoing and is coordinated by the ICOM Standing Committee for Ethics (ETHCOM), a dedicated ICOM body which handles ethical issues relating to museums.

Red Lists
Since 2000, ICOM has published its Red Lists to combat the illicit traffic in cultural goods which causes significant damage to heritage, particularly in regions of the world where cultural property is most susceptible to theft and looting. Supporting the fight against illicit traffic in cultural goods is among ICOM's highest priorities, and the Lists raise awareness on smuggling and illicit trade in cultural objects. The ICOM Red Lists are tools designed to help police and customs officials, heritage professionals, and art and antiquities dealers to identify the types of objects that are most susceptible to illicit trafficking.

ICOM has already published Red Lists for many different countries and regions:

 Archaeological Objects in Africa
 Latin America
 Central America and Mexico
 Haiti
 Antiquities in Peru
 Colombia
 Antiquities in Cambodia
 Afghanistan Antiquities
 China
 Iraq
 Egypt
 Syria

Red Lists are not lists of stolen objects, but are awareness raising tools that identify the categories of cultural objects that can be subjected to theft and traffic. They help individuals, organisations and authorities, such as police or customs officials, identify objects at risk and prevent them from being illegally sold or exported. The cultural goods depicted on the lists are inventoried objects within the collections of recognised institutions. They serve to illustrate the categories of cultural goods most vulnerable to illicit traffic.

ICOM publishes the Red Lists with the scientific collaboration of national and international experts and the support of dedicated sponsors, to cover the most vulnerable areas of the world in terms of illicit trafficking of cultural objects. The lists are published in different languages according to the context of each List. Among other success stories, these tools have contributed to the identification, recovery and restitution of thousands of cultural objects from Iraq, Afghanistan and Mali.

Museums emergency programme
ICOM is committed to providing cultural institutions with the necessary support and risk prevention tools when faced with conflict situations or natural disasters. Through its Disaster Relief for Museums Task Force (DRTF), its Museums Emergency Programme (MEP) and its active role in the Blue Shield, ICOM assists museums worldwide by mobilising its resources quickly and efficiently to provide support in both the prevention and the aftermath of disaster situations.

The Getty Conservation Institute and ICCROM (International Centre for the Study of the Preservation and Restoration of Cultural Property) took part in this programme and helped develop training tools for MEP. ICOM's action programme offers a long-term global response that strengthens the Blue Shield dynamism.

International Museum Day
Every year since 1977, ICOM has organised International Museum Day, a worldwide event held around 18 May. From America and Oceania to Europe, Asia and Africa, International Museum Day aims to increase public awareness of the role of museums in developing society.

Committees
ICOM operates 32 international committees on a range of museum specialties, who conduct advanced research in their respective fields for the benefit of the museum community.

 AFRICOM – International Council of African Museums
 AVICOM – Audio-visual & New Technologies and Social Media
 CAMOC – Museums of Cities
 CECA – Education & Cultural Action
 CIDOC – Documentation
 CIMCIM – Museums and Collections of Instruments and Music
 CIMUSET – Science & Technology
 COMCOL – Collecting
 COSTUME – International Committee for Museums and Collections of Costume 
 DEMHIST – Historic House Museums
 GLASS
 ICAMT- Architecture & Museum Techniques
 ICDAD – Decorative Arts and Design
 ICEE – Exhibition Exchange
 ICFA – Fine Arts
 ICLM – Literary Museums
 ICMAH – Archaeology & History
 ICME – Ethnography
 ICMEMO – Memorial Museums
 ICMS – Museum Security
 ICR – Regional Museums
 ICOFOM – Museology
 ICOMAM – Arms & Military History
 ICOM-CC – Conservation
 ICOMON – Money & Banking Museums
 ICTOP – Training of Personnel
 INTERCOM – Management
 NATHIST – Natural History
 ICOM MPR (International Committee for Marketing and Public Relation): this committee was founded in 1977 by Jan Jelínek, and provides training for museum professionals in marketing and communications, through annual conferences and a regular online newsletter. The most recent conference was held in Armenia in 2015, with the theme of “Emerging Trends”. Previous conferences have been held in Taiwan, Rio de Janeiro, Palermo, Brno, Shanghai, Moscow and Yasnaya Polyana, and Paraty and Rio de Janeiro.  The MPR board consists of marketing and communication museum professionals from several countries. Each member is elected for a 3-year term at ICOM General Conferences.
 UMAC – University Museums
International Council of African Museums
ICOM comprises also 118 national committees that ensure that the interests of the organisation are managed in their respective countries. The national committees represent their members within ICOM and they contribute to the implementation of the organisation's programmes.

General Conference
The ICOM General Conference is held every three years and gathers museum professionals from several countries. The first meeting was held in Paris in 1948. In recent years, General Conferences have been held in Seoul in 2004 (the first meeting in Asia), in Vienna in 2007, and in Shanghai in 2010. This 22nd General Conference in Shanghai followed the World Expo where the ICOM's Pavilion was inaugurated and named “Museums, Heart of the City”. The General Conference was held in Rio de Janeiro in 2013, in Milan in 2016, in Kyoto in 2019, in Prague in 2022. Dubai is to welcome the 27th ICOM General Conference dedicated to “The Future of Museums in Rapidly Changing Communities” in 2025.

Governance
The current ICOM President is Ms. Emma Nardi. She succeeded Mr. Alberto Garlandini. The current director general is Dr. Peter Keller.  He succeeded Prof. Dr. Anne-Catherine Robert-Hauglustaine (2014–2016) and Ms. Hanna Pennock (2013–2014).

Presidents

CIDOC conceptual reference model

CIDOC, ICOM's International Committee for Documentation, provides the museum community with standards and advice on museum documentation.

The CIDOC Conceptual Reference Model (CRM), formalised as the official international standard ISO 21127, is used to map cultural heritage information to a common and extensible semantic framework. This "semantic glue" can be used to connect between different sources of cultural heritage information published by museums, libraries and archives.

The Committee was founded by Ivan Illich in 1961 in Cuernavaca, Mexico.

Online museums
ICOM was the first international organization to participate in the Virtual Library museums pages (VLmp) online museums directory in the 1990s. It was also instrumental in the creation of the ".museum" top-level domain (TLD) for museums online through the Museum Domain Management Association (MuseDoma).

Member organizations
The International Association of Transport and Communication Museums (IATM) is a world-wide membership organisation of museums which collect, interpret and make public material and information about transport and/or communication.

References

External links

 ICOM website
 UNESCO's Website
 ICOM-CC
 ICAMT
 The Metropolitan Museum of Art records regarding International Council of Museums, 1951–1965 from The Metropolitan Museum of Art Archives, New York.

 
Organizations established in 1946
Museum associations and consortia
Museum-related professional associations
Organizations based in Paris
Conservation and restoration organizations
International organizations based in France
UNESCO
Heritage organizations
History organizations based in France